Ball Corporation is an American company headquartered in Broomfield, Colorado. It is best known for its early production of glass jars, lids, and related products used for home canning. Since its founding in Buffalo, New York, in 1880, when it was known as the Wooden Jacket Can Company, the Ball company has expanded and diversified into other business ventures, including aerospace technology. It eventually became the world's largest manufacturer of recyclable metal beverage and food containers.

The Ball brothers renamed their business the Ball Brothers Glass Manufacturing Company, incorporated in 1886. Its headquarters, as well as its glass and metal manufacturing operations, were moved to Muncie, Indiana, by 1889. The business was renamed the Ball Brothers Company in 1922 and the Ball Corporation in 1969. It became a publicly traded stock company on the New York Stock Exchange in 1973.

Ball left the home canning business in 1993 by spinning off a former subsidiary (Alltrista) into a free-standing company, which renamed itself Jarden Corporation. As part of the spin-off, Jarden is licensed to use the Ball registered trademark on its line of home-canning products. Today, the Ball brand for mason jars and home canning supplies belongs to Newell Brands.

History

Early years
In 1880, Frank C. and Edmund B. Ball, two of the five Ball brothers, borrowed $200 from their uncle, George Harvey Ball, founder and first president of Keuka College, to buy the Wooden Jacket Can Company, a small manufacturing business in Buffalo, New York. Soon, the three other brothers (William, Lucius, and George) joined Frank and Edmund in Buffalo. (Years later, the brothers reciprocated their uncle's early assistance by providing financial support to Keuka College.)

The Ball brothers' company made tin cans encased in wooden jackets to hold kerosene, paints, or varnishes. Because the acid used to refine kerosene caused corrosion in tin, the brothers decided to use glass for the inserts of the wood-jacketed cans. Initially, they bought the glass containers from a factory in Poughkeepsie, New York. Around 1885 a group of Belgian glassblowers who were passing through Buffalo encouraged the Ball brothers to build their own factory. The Ball brothers purchased land in East Buffalo, where they built a two-story brick building for the stamping works and a one-story frame factory for the glass works. Although a fire destroyed an early glass factory in Buffalo, the brothers rebuilt and expanded the business. To keep the new factory's furnace operating at full capacity, the company introduced new products and made improvements to its glass and metal manufacturing processes.

Around 1884, when the brothers discovered that the patent covering the Mason Improved fruit jar had expired, their company began manufacturing canning jars in their glassworks. The Ball brothers' "Buffalo" jars, which were made in such sizes as half-gallon, pint, and midget, were manufactured during a part of 1884, 1885, and 1886. Jar lids were produced in their metal fabricating factory. The Ball Company's logo was embossed onto the surface of the jars, which were made of either amber or aqua (blue-green) glass.

On February 13, 1886, the company incorporated as Ball Brothers Manufacturing Company. About the same time the factory in Buffalo was destroyed by fire in 1886, the brothers began to consider moving their business closer to natural gas supplies. While on a business trip in Cleveland, Ohio, Frank heard about the natural gas boom in Findlay, Ohio. After visiting the town, he told Edmund about the economic advantages of using natural gas instead of coal for manufacturing glass. Edmund visited several towns in the gas fields, including Muncie, Indiana. The two brothers decided to make a more extensive trip to investigate the possibility of establishing a glass factory closer to an abundant supply of natural gas. They briefly had doubts about extending beyond Buffalo, but decided to explore the use of natural gas as a means of expanding their glass-making business.

Frank and Edmund first visited in Fostoria, Ohio, where they were enthusiastically welcomed. The next stop was Bowling Green, Ohio. After a night in town, Edmund returned to Buffalo, but Frank remained. After Frank had been in Bowling Green for about a week, he received a telegram from James Boyce, a Muncie businessman. Frank, who had become weary of Bowling Green, was ready for a change and "decided to run down to Muncie and see what they had to offer." As Frank recalled his early discussions with Muncie's town leaders, "There was nothing about the town that particularly appealed to me, but the men were all courteous, kind, and businesslike." Frank agreed to a proposal that offered the Ball brothers  of land for a factory site, a gas well, and $5,000 in cash to encourage the move to Muncie. In addition, city officials agreed to provide a railroad connection to the brothers' new facilities. By September 1887 construction had begun on the Muncie factory and the Ball brothers began plans to move their glass manufacturing operations from New York. Frank remained in Muncie to get the factory up and running, while Edmund closed the glass factory in Buffalo, then moved to Muncie to join Frank. Their brothers, William and George, remained in Buffalo to operate the stamping works and a factory in Bath, New York.

In 1888 the company opened its first glass manufacturing facility in Muncie. On February 18 fires were started in the new factory's furnace; on March 1 its first glass products were made. The first products to be manufactured in the new factory in Muncie were oil containers and lamp chimneys, not fruit jars. By 1889 the Ball company's headquarters and its glass and metal manufacturing operations had moved to Muncie. The other Ball brothers moved to Indiana in the 1890s. George moved  to Muncie in 1893, William arrived in 1897, and Lucius, a company shareholder and a physician, moved to Muncie in 1894.

In the late nineteenth century, the company continued to grow and prosper, but not without experiencing some challenges. Fires at its Muncie factories and warehouses in 1891 and 1898 damaged its facilities, but they were rebuilt. Despite the economic panic of 1893, the company was able to produce 22 million fruit jars for the year beginning in September 1894, and 37 million jars by 1897. When natural gas supplies in the area began to diminish, the Ball brothers installed gas converters to use Indiana coal in their factories and continued manufacturing operations. The company's F. C. Ball machine, patented in 1898, introduced mass production into its glass-blowing process and gave it a competitive market advantage. By 1905 the company was producing 60 million canning jars per year and had acquired other glass manufacturers, expanding its operations to include seven factories in addition to its main facilities at Muncie.

In a continuation of the company's difficulties in Muncie, workers organized with Local 200 (Glass Workers) of the Industrial Workers of the World (IWW) at the main facility, went on strike in March 1910, with the strikers demanding wage increases. A settlement was quickly reached on March 29, but company management reneged on the agreement and threatened to declare a lockout. The strike continued, but was weakened by the refusal of machinists affiliated with the American Federation of Labor to join the strike. By the end of April, the strike was lost.

Diversification
Ball remained a family-owned business for over 90 years. Renamed the Ball Brothers Company in 1922, it is best known for manufacturing fruit jars, lids, and related products for home canning. The company also entered into other business ventures. Because the four main components of their core product line of canning jars included glass, zinc, rubber, and paper, the Ball company acquired a zinc strip rolling mill to produce metal lids for their glass jars, manufactured rubber sealing rings for the jars, and acquired a paper mill to fabricate the packaging used in shipping their products. The company also acquired tin, steel, and later, plastic companies.

The Ball company faced additional challenges and opportunities during the Great Depression and World War II. Prior to 1933, Ball was the largest domestic manufacturer of home canning jars. In 1939 it manufactured 54% of all the canning jars made in the US. A drop in demand for the jars during the 1930s led the Ball brothers to begin manufacturing other types of jars and bottles for commercial use, and expand into other lines of business. During World War II the company's operations were converted to produce shells and machine parts for the military. After the war, Ball's glass-making business was hindered by an antitrust case in which the company was one of several defendants. The legal case was appealed to the U.S. Supreme Court. The final decision, which was handed down in 1947, restricted Ball's ability to acquire other glass manufacturers and other businesses producing glass-making machinery without prior court approval. In 1949 decreasing demand for canning jars caused the company to suffer its first net operating loss. With legal restrictions on the company's ability to expand its glass-making business and declining demand for its canning jars, Ball company executives decided that in order to grow it had to further diversity its holdings.

In the 1950s the Ball company entered the aerospace industry. Laboratories for the Ball Brothers Research Corporation were established at Boulder, Colorado, and in Muncie. The company began manufacturing aerospace equipment in 1959. Its OSO-1 (Orbiting Solar Observatory) satellite, designed and built for the National Aeronautics and Space Administration (NASA) with $1.4 million in grants, launched into space on March 7, 1962, at Cape Canaveral, Florida. Its success led to additional contracts to build more satellites, a total of seven, but not without some losses. An explosion killed three workers and damaged the company's OSO-2 satellite in 1964.

The company continued to expand into other areas such as avionics, aerospace systems, and metal beverage and food containers. Renamed the Ball Corporation in 1969, it acquired Jeffco Manufacturing Company, a maker of recyclable aluminum beverage cans, and became the largest producer of recyclable beverage cans in the world. Although glass production in Muncie ceased in 1962, it continued at other Ball plants until its final glass manufacturing operations were sold in 1996.
 
Ball Corporation's stock went public on July 13, 1972. It became a publicly traded stock company on the New York Stock Exchange in 1973. The stock began trading at $26 per share on the NYSE on December 17, 1973, using the trading symbol BLL.

Ball no longer produces its glass canning jars. In the early 1990s Ball exited the home-canning business, when it established a subsidiary named Alltrista, which consisted of seven smaller Ball subsidiaries that included the Ball jar and other canning-related products. When Altrista Corporation became a separate company in April 1993, Ball shareholders received one share of Alltrista stock for every four shares of Ball stock. Altrista was renamed Jarden Corporation in 2001. Jarden retains the license to use the Ball registered trademark on its line of home-canning products, a part of Jarden's branded consumables business. (Jarden produces lids for several brands of fruit jars at its Muncie plant and its jars are made by a variety of glass producers.)

In 1998 the Ball Corporation moved its corporate headquarters from Muncie to Broomfield, Colorado, where its oversees global operations as a manufacturer of metal food and beverage containers, as well as a manufacturer of equipment and supplier of services to the aerospace industry.

Company milestones
 1880, Frank and Edmund Ball acquired the Wood Jacket Can Company, the predecessor to the Ball Corporation, in Buffalo, New York
 1886, incorporated as Ball Brothers Glass Manufacturing Company
 1887, a new glass factory was built in Muncie, Indiana; metal manufacturing operations continued at Buffalo and Bath, New York
 1889, the company's metal fittings operations were moved to Muncie
 1897, F. C. Ball Machine, the world's first semiautomatic glass machine, was invented (U.S. patent number 610515, issued in 1898)
1909, The Correct Method for Preserving Fruit, predecessor to The Ball Blue Book was published; it featured home-canning recipes and techniques.
 1922, name changed to Ball Brothers Company
 1945, fire causes $500,000 in damages to Ball's glass plant number one in Muncie
1956, Ball formed Ball Brothers Research Corporation to produce goods and services for the aerospace sector. This was converted to a wholly owned subsidiary, Ball Aerospace & Technologies Corp., in 1995.
 1961, Ball purchased Industrial Rubber of St. Joseph, MI. which was later sold to Chardon Rubber in 1978.
 1962, Ball's Muncie glass plant is closed
 1969, company name is changed to the Ball Corporation
 1973, Ball became a publicly traded stock listed on New York Stock Exchange
 1993, Alltrista, a Ball subsidiary, was spun off into a separate corporation. Renamed the Jarden Corporation in 2002, it uses of the Ball registered trademark on its line of home-canning products.
1994, Ball began manufacturing PET plastic containers.
1995, Ball created Ball-Foster Glass Container Co., a joint venture glass company with Saint-Gobain.
1996, Ball exited the glass business, selling its interests in Ball-Foster to Saint-Gobain.
 1998, corporate headquarters relocated from Muncie, Indiana, to Broomfield, Colorado
2002, Ball acquired Schmalbach-Lubeca AG, the German-based metal beverage container company, and created Ball Packaging Europe.
2005, Ball celebrated its 125th anniversary.
2006, Ball acquired U.S. Can, Inc., the largest U.S. manufacturer of aerosol cans.
2008, Ball Corporation issued its first sustainability report.
2010, Ball acquired Aerocan S.A.S., makers of aluminum aerosol cans and bottles, for $292 million.
2016, Ball acquired Rexam, a UK-based packaging company
2020, Ball acquired Tubex Industria E Comercio de Embalagens Ltda in Brazil, for $80 million.
2020, Ball acquired the naming rights of Pepsi Center in Downtown Denver and renamed it Ball Arena.

Major subsidiaries
 Ball Aerospace & Technologies Corp.
Ball Packaging Europe GmbH

Environmental record
The Ball Corporation has made improvements to its environmental record since 2006, when the company began its first formal sustainability efforts. In 2008 the Ball Corporation issued its first sustainability report and began releases subsequent sustainability reports on its website. The first report was an ACCA-Ceres North American Sustainability Awards cowinner of the Best First Time Reporter award in 2009.

In the Toxic 100 list for 2004, using data from 2002, researchers at the University of Massachusetts Amherst's Political Economy Research Institute (PERI) identified the Ball Corporation as the 59th-largest corporate producer of Air pollution in the United States, with an estimated 4.57 million pounds of toxic air released annually. The PERI report for 2008, using data from 2005, ranked the Ball Corporation 54th on its Toxic 100 list; PERI's report for 2010, using data from 2006, ranked it 65th. The PERI studies indicated major pollutants included glycol ethers and 1,2,4-trimethylbenzene.

The PERI Toxic 100 Air Polluters list for 2013 ranked the Ball Corporation as 619 in its list of companies producing the most air pollution in the United States. In 2015 Newsweek ranked the Ball Corporation as 70th in their "Green 2015" report, which reviewed the environmental performances of the 500 largest publicly traded companies in the United States.

Notes

References
 
  
 
 
 
 
 
 
 
 
 
 
 
 
 
 
 
 
 Quigley, Barbara, "The Ball Brothers" in

Further reading

External links

 
Packaging companies of the United States
Glassmaking companies of the United States
Manufacturing companies based in Colorado
Companies based in Broomfield, Colorado
Manufacturing companies established in 1880
1880 establishments in New York (state)
Companies listed on the New York Stock Exchange
1970s initial public offerings